, is a Japanese animation studio founded in January 1986 by Tomoyuki Miyata, who previously worked at Tatsunoko Production. The studio's first release was  Yōtōden in 1987. They have produced several well-known anime series, such as Food Wars!: Shokugeki no Soma, the A Certain Magical Index franchise (including Railgun and Accelerator), Date A Live III, Toradora!, The Disastrous Life of Saiki K., Maid Sama!, The Familiar of Zero, Revolutionary Girl Utena, Bakuman, Shakugan no Shana, Azumanga Daioh, and One-Punch Man season 2.

Productions

TV series

Films

OVAs / ONAs

Video games

Notes

References

External links 
 

 
Japanese companies established in 1986
Animation studios in Tokyo
Mass media companies established in 1986
Japanese animation studios
Musashino, Tokyo